Al Duhail Handball Team, formerly Lekhwiya, is the handball team of Al-Duhail SC, based in the capital city of Doha, Qatar. It currently competes in the Qatar Handball League (QHL) and was founded in 2013. It plays its home games at the Abdullah bin Khalifa Stadium.

History
The idea to form Lekhwiya's handball division began in April 2012 when the Qatar Handball Federation wanted to increase the number of teams participating in the league. Lekhwiya were presented with an opportunity to form a handball team and participate in the first division, and the president of the club, Abdullah Al Thani, accepted. Jabbes Ibrahim was selected as the first coach of the team.

In April 2017, the club took over El Jaish SC and rebranded the club into Al-Duhail SC.

Honours
 Qatar Handball League
 Winners (4): 2012–13 (as Lekhwiya), 2017–18, 2020–21, 2021–22 Amir cup 2021-22

Managerial history
 Jabbes Ibrahim (April 2012 – July 2013)
 Ibrahim Budrala (July 2013 – January 2015 )
 Sead Hasanefendić (February 2015)

References

External links
Official website 
Qatar Handball Federation

Qatari handball clubs
Lekhwiya SC
Handball clubs established in 2012
2012 establishments in Qatar
Sports clubs in Doha